Billund is a municipality in the centre of the Jutland Peninsula in Denmark. Formerly the municipality belonged to Ribe County. The new, merged municipality covers an area of 540.18 km², and has a total population of 26,631 (2022). Its mayor is Ib Kristensen, a member of Venstre (Liberal Party) political party. The site of its municipal council is the town of Grindsted, which is the largest town in the municipality followed by the city of Billund.

On 1 January 2007, as a result of Kommunalreformen ("The Municipal Reform" of 2007), the old Billund municipality was combined with the former Grindsted Municipality and the part of Billund Airport that was located in Give Municipality.

The municipality is part of the Triangle Region and of the East Jutland metropolitan area, which had a total population of 1.378 million in 2016.

Locations

Politics
Billund's municipal council consists of 25 members, elected every four years. The municipal council has six political committees.

Municipal council
Below are the municipal councils elected since the Municipal Reform of 2007.

Economy
LEGO Group and Sun Air of Scandinavia have their head offices in Billund, Billund Municipality. The first Legoland has operated here since 1968.

Twin towns – sister cities

Billund is twinned with:
 Hohenwestedt, Germany

References

Sources
 Municipal mergers and neighbors: Eniro new municipalities map
 Billund and western Denmark
 Nuha Ansari, John D. Rambow, Denmark: The Guide for All Budgets, Rambow, 2002, Fodor's Denmark, 224 pages 
 Hogan, C.Michael, Egtved Girl Barrow, The Megalithic Portal, editor A. Burnham 4 October, 2007

External links

 Official website 
 VisitBillund - Official Touristguide - The perfect starting point for a good stay
 Lego braces for big changes, a July 2005 International Herald Tribune article
 Satellite image from Google Maps
 Trekantomraadet - Association formed by the six municipalities in the area: Billund, Fredericia, Kolding, Middelfart, Vejen and Vejle 
 Region of Southern Denmark's official website 

 
Municipalities of the Region of Southern Denmark
Municipalities of Denmark
Populated places established in 2007